Mikko Herranen is a Finnish singer and musician. His current band Misterer is a thrash metal band from Helsinki and they are preparing songs for their upcoming debut album. Previously, he fronted RUST, which released three albums and several singles between 2003 and 2010. Herranen competed in Michael Monroe's team in the reality singing competition The Voice of Finland in 2012. His debut solo album Kylmä maailma was released through Johanna Kustannus in June 2012.

Career

RUST 
Herranen was the main composer and the singer/bass player of RUST, a post-grunge/metal band out of Helsinki. Since the band's formation  in 2001, Herranen also produced all the band's recordings, including three full-length albums, two EP's and five singles. Their debut album Softly was released in August 2004 and it reached Top50 on the Finnish album chart. Finland's top nationwide Rock radio network YLEX chose "Softly" as the album of the week in August 2004.

Solo 
After reaching Top8 on The Voice of Finland Herranen signed a record deal with Johanna/Universal to release his solo album Kylmä Maailma (Cold World). He has written all the songs, sings and plays all the instruments except cello and violin on the album that he had been writing for the past four years. His twin sister has written lyrics on two tracks, and his The Voice coach Michael Monroe makes an appearance playing sax and harmonica on one of the tracks. The album was recorded and mixed at his Noise Floor studio. The album debuted at No. 6 on the Finnish album chart.

Other projects 
Apart from singing and playing a variety of instruments in several bands, Herranen has also established himself as a record producer and sound engineer both in studio and live concerts. He has predominantly been involved with the production of heavy metal recordings and concerts of such bands as Lullacry, Carnalation, Profane Omen, Kilt, Plastic Tears, The Chant, Iiwanajulma, Misery Inc., and Killpretty. As a lead vocalist, Herranen has fronted many cover bands playing the music of Iron Maiden, Alice in Chains, Metallica, and Pantera.

Mikko Herranen is a 2001 Rosemary Kennedy International Young Soloist Award Winner.

Personal life 
Herranen began studying piano at the age of three, drums at the age thirteen and voice in high school. At the Pop & Jazz Conservatory in Helsinki, he has been able to study, compose, produce and teach music. He is engaged to a vocal coach and singer Mari Multanen.

Despite his vision loss, Herranen is able to read and operate computers, mixing consoles and other machinery.

Discography 

Misterer

 Ignoramus -album  TCM 2019
 Backrage -single  TCM 2018
 Disconnected -single TCM 2018
 Perkelation -single TCM 2018

RUST

 The Black EP  RUST/TCM 2003
 Miss You  -single TCM 2004
 Ordinary World -single TCM 2004
 Softly -album TCM 2004
 Addiction/Levottomat 3 Movie Soundtrack Poko 2004
 Pray  -single Edel 2004
 Slave -single TCM 2005
 Away -single 92Dawn 2006
 Songs of Suffocation -album 92Dawn 2006
 Scars  -EP 92Dawn 2007
 Dark Deep Times -album RUST 2010

Velcra

 Consequences of Disobedience, Virgin Records (EMI) 2001
 Between Force and Fate, EMI 2005
 Hadal (drums, recording), Bonnier Amigo 2007

Killpretty

 The Art of Letting Go (producer, recording, mixing, mastering) 2006

Beagon

 Traffic (mixing) 2007

Misery Inc.

 ...BreedGreedBreed... (producing, recording) 2007

Iiwanajulma

 Tuhottu tila (producing, recording, mixing 2008

The Chant

 Ghostlines (mixing) 2008

Plastic Tears

 Nine Lives Never Dies (recording, mixing, keyboards) 2009

Kilt

 Everything / Nothing (recording, mixing, vocals) 2009

Profane Omen

 Inherit The Void (vocal production) 2009

Lullacry

 Where Angels Fear (recording, mixing, producing, vocals) 2012

Filmography 

 Addiction (Levottomat 3) composer: Miss You (2004)
 Game Over arranger: "The Bong Song – BamBamBholeRemix" (2005)
 Tuuliajolla – Rockumentary film from Saimaa (2006)
 Not Born To Rock – composer (6 episodes, 2007)
 Pokeritähti 2007 – composer: theme music (12 episodes, 2008)

References

External links 
official site
Misterer

Finnish male musicians
Living people
1976 births